is a Paralympian athlete from Japan competing mainly in category T54 long-distance events.

Sasahara was born on April 20, 1974, in Bungotakada City, Oita Prefecture. He competed in the 2004 Summer Paralympics in Athens, Greece. There he finished tenth in the men's 10000 metres - T54 event and finished ninth in the men's Marathon - T54 event. He also competed at the 2008 Summer Paralympics in Beijing, China. There he won a silver medal in the men's Marathon - T54 event and went out in the semi-finals of the men's 800 metres - T54 event

External links
 

Paralympic athletes of Japan
Athletes (track and field) at the 2004 Summer Paralympics
Athletes (track and field) at the 2008 Summer Paralympics
Paralympic silver medalists for Japan
Year of birth missing (living people)
Living people
Japanese male wheelchair racers
Paralympic wheelchair racers
Medalists at the 2008 Summer Paralympics
Paralympic medalists in athletics (track and field)